Syarhey Hihevich (born 26 January 1987) is a Belarusian former professional footballer.

Honours
Dinamo Minsk
Belarusian Premier League champion: 2004

Minsk
Belarusian Cup winner: 2012–13

References

External links

1987 births
Living people
Belarusian footballers
Association football midfielders
FC RUOR Minsk players
FC Dinamo Minsk players
FC Minsk players
FC Isloch Minsk Raion players
FC Vitebsk players
FC Smorgon players
FC Orsha players
People from Barysaw
Sportspeople from Minsk Region